Philippe Rahmy (5 June 1965, in Geneva – 1 October 2017) was a Swiss poet and writer.

Biography 

Philippe Rahmy studied the history of arts and Egyptology at the École du Louvre in Paris, and graduated from the University of Lausanne in literature and philosophy.

He was a founding member of the prominent French literary site remue.net, focused on promoting contemporary literature over the Internet and through live events. He is a published author in France, USA, Italy, Switzerland and China.

Philippe Rahmy was also active as a photographer and as a director of award-winning independent short films. Philippe Rahmy had Osteogenesis imperfecta (brittle bones), and he was an active member of several disability-related associations. He was also writing songs for the rock band "I need my gasoline".

He was working on a literary and multimedia project about abandoned cities. The Abandoned City is a collaborative writing project. Hosted on D-FICTION, it will ultimately find its dedicated platform, an open website gathering a large range of tools for geolocation, virtual exploration of the landscape, artistic creation, and communication. Literary at first, this interdisciplinary project will welcome, later, visual arts, music, staged arts and street arts, as well as academic productions.

Books 
 2017 : Monarques, éditions de La Table Ronde, coll. Vermillon
 2016 : Allegra, éditions de La Table Ronde, coll. Vermillon, January 2016 (awarded the Prix Rambert 2016 and the Swiss Literature Award 2017)
 2015 : Béton armé, Collection Folio (n° 5946), Gallimard, 2015
 2014 : Loop Road, nerval.fr, March 2014
 2013 : Béton armé – Shanghai au corps à corps, Éditions de La Table Ronde Editions Table Ronde - Littérature française et étrangère, essais et documents, beaux livres, La Petite Vermillon, preface Jean-Christophe Rufin de l'Académie française, September 2013 (awarded the Prix Wepler 2013 Mention spéciale du jury // One of the 20 best books of the year 2013, palmarès Lire; Prix Michel-Dentan 2014)
 2013 : Corps au miroir, avec Sabine Oppliger, Encre et lumière, 2013
 2010 : Cheyne, 30 ans, 30 voix, Livres hors collection, 2010
 2009 : Cellules souches, avec Stéphane Dussel, Mots tessons, 2009
 2009 : Movimento dalla fine, a cura di Monica Pavani, Mobydick, 2009
 2008 : SMS de la cloison, publie.net, 2008
 2008 : Architecture nuit, texte expérimental, publie.net, 2008
 2007 : Demeure le corps, Chant d'exécration, Cheyne Editeur, 2007
 2005 : Mouvement par la fin, Un portrait de la douleur, Cheyne Editeur, 2005 (postface Jacques Dupin, Prix des Charmettes – Jean-Jacques Rousseau 2006)

Articles 
 La couleur des jours, "Pardon pour l'Amérique", 31-08-2017, extract of an ongoing novel, written at the foundation Jan Michalski
 Specimen, The Babel Revue of Translation, "Pardon pour l'Amérique", fr/eng, transl. by Carla Calimani, 06-2017
 Viceversa littérature, nr. 11, "Dialogue avec Philippe Rahmy : l'écriture en acte" by Marina Skalova, followed by "retour architecture nuit" by François Bon, 04-2017
 Diacritik, "Le roi est vulnérable", 24-02-2017
 Château de Lavigny, 20 ans, anthologie anniversaire, "Le Châtiment", 08-2016
 Página/12, "Todos tenemos alguna discapacidad", 19-04-2016
 La moitié du fourbi, Nr. 3, "Un portrait du Fayoum", 03-2016
 Le Persil, Special edition dedicated to poetry in the francophone part of Switzerland, "Comme le caméléon, sa langue", 03-2016
 Postface to the book "Kvar lo" from Sabine Huynh (poems, with ink paintings from Caroline François-Rubino), Éditions Æncrages & Co, coll. Écri(peind)re, 2016
 Le Magazine Littéraire, Nr. 541, 03–2014, "Alors, Shanghai?"
 Le Magazine Littéraire, Nr. 532, 06–2013, "Paul Auster, le grand entretien"
 D-Fiction, 05–2013, "Aran"
 Art+Politique, 2012, "Du partage des richesses"
 Lieux d'Être, N°51, printemps 2011, "Il ne suffit pas de bégayer"
 Viceversa Littérature, N°5 (2011), "Château Solitude"
 La Revue de Belles-Lettres, 134e année, numéro 1–2 2010, "Un terrain parmi d'autres"
 Antilipseis Magazine, mars 2011, in: "Perceptions"
 The Black Herald Press, 1st issue, January 2011,
 revue China Dolls, Beijing, été 2010, "The Glory of the body",
 revue Hétérographe N°4, automne 2010, Sandra Moussempès, Photogénie des ombres peintes
 revue fario, May/June 2009, " La vie sauve "
 revue Faire Part, " Caroline Sagot Duvauroux, Vol-ce-l'est, l'autre chose ", avril 2009
 participation au catalogue d'exposition du peintre Winfried Veit, avril 2009
 revue Viola, " Solitudine publica ", mars 2009
 revue Hétérographe, " Solitude publique ", mars 2009
 revue Action restreinte, " Kit & Scat Song ", février 2009
 François Bon, " Tu marchais dans la maison des morts, vidéo ", dans : " François Bon, éclats de réalité ", Dominique Viart et Jean-Bernard Vray (eds), PU de Saint Etienne 2008
 Joë Bousquet, " Mystique ", dans : Joë Bousquet, " Maigre nudité du soir ", éditions de l'Atelier du Gué 2008
 revue Lieux d'Être N° 45, " Naître détruit ", 2007
 revue Faire Part N° 20–21, " Coudrier, une gravure à la Manière noire ", dans : " Matière d'Origine : Jacques Dupin ", 2007
 Aral, dans : " Jean-Marie Barnaud, Pour saluer la bienvenue ", Bibliothèque municipale de Charleville-Mézières 2002

Short movies 
Phil Rahmy displayed his vision as a director and award-winning independent short film producer through his later productions which were  being distributed and viewed globally.
Later viewings
 Uplink Factory, video festival, official selection of Swiss short films (OBLO), "The Body remains", Tokyo, Japan, 2011.
 Gallery Arts-en-l'Ile, projection of "M.R.I. ", curator Penelope Petsini, Geneva, Switzerland, 2010
 Special Prize of the Jury at the Oblò Underground Short Film Festival, "The Body remains", Lausanne, Switzerland, 2009
 Museum of Modern Arts (MAMCO), projection of "M.R.I"., Geneva, Switzerland, 2009
 Festival Côté Court 2008, official selection of "The Body remains", Cinéma 104, Pantin, France, 2008.
 Un festival c'est trop court, programm FILMS D'ICI, official selection, "The Body remains", Nice, France, 2008.
 Official Selection for exhibition in the New York International Independent Film & Video Festival, "The Body remains", New York February, Manhattan, NYC, 2008.

Photography 
His photographic work concentrated on the human body and the topic of so-called "normality".

Later expos
 Photovision 2011, exposition of the series "The Glory of the Body", in collaboration with Antilipseis Magazine of Photography. At the end of 2011, the expo will be part of the Athens School of Fine Arts fund, Athens, Greece, 2011.
 China Dolls Magazine, "Body & Norm", Beijing, China, 2010.
 Special Prize of the Jury at the Oblò Underground Short Film Festival, "The Body remains", Lausanne, Switzerland, 2009
 Universal Exposition of Shanghai, "Immobility and Movement", FFA Pavilion, Shanghai, China, 2010
 Revue d'Ici Là, Online Art Magazine, France, 2010.
 Un festival c'est trop court, programm FILMS D'ICI, official selection, "The Body remains", Nice, France, 2008.

Screenwriting 
Phil Rahmy was active as a screenwriter, and has co-founded Wallman Productions, a Hollywood-based independent film and music production company, in association with the famous jazzman Art Johnson.

Distinctions / Grants 
 2006 : Prix des Charmettes/Jean-Jacques Rousseau for "Mouvement par la fin" (Cheyne Editeur, 2005)
 2010 : Lauréat de la bourse d'écriture Pro Helvetia
 2010 : Finaliste Prix FEMS pour la littérature  
 2011 : Writer-in-residence, Shanghai Writers Association
 2013 : Prix Wepler Fondation La Poste 2013 Mention spéciale du jury for Béton armé (Éditions La Table Ronde, 2013)
 2014 : Meilleur récit de voyage - Sélection Lire for Béton armé (Éditions La Table Ronde, 2013)
 2014 : Prix Pittard de l'Andelyn for Béton armé (Éditions La Table Ronde, 2013)
 2014 : Prix Dentan for Béton armé (Éditions La Table Ronde, 2013)
 2015 : Writer-in-residence, Château de Lavigny
 2016 : Writer-in-residence, Escuela de Otoño de Traducción Literaria en Lenguas Vivas, Buenos Aires
 2016 :  Prix Eugène-Rambert for Allegra (Éditions La Table Ronde, 2016)
 2017 :  Swiss Literature Awards for Allegra (Éditions La Table Ronde, 2016) 
 2017 : Writer-in-residence, Fondation Jan Michalski pour l'écriture et la littérature, Montricher, Switzerland

References

Sources 
 Bibliothèque cantonale universitaire
 articles by Philippe Rahmy on remue.net
 texts by Philippe Rahmy on remue.net
 poetry books edited by Cheyne Editeur
 rahmyfiction.net Philippe Rahmy's blog

1965 births
2017 deaths
Swiss male poets
Swiss male novelists
People with osteogenesis imperfecta
21st-century Swiss novelists
21st-century Swiss poets
21st-century male writers
People from Geneva